"Caméléon" is a song by Congolese-French singer and rapper Maître Gims released in November 2017. The song has so far peaked at number seven on the French Singles Chart.

Charts

Certifications

References

2017 singles
2017 songs
French-language songs
Gims songs
Songs written by Renaud Rebillaud
Songs written by Gims